Arts et Métiers (literally "Arts and Trades") is a station on Line 3 and Line 11 of the Paris Métro. Its located in the 3rd arrondissement of Paris.

Location
The station is located at the intersection of Rues Beaubourg, Réaumur and Turbigo, the platforms established:
 on line 3, in a curve under the angle formed by these last two streets and oriented east–west, between Réaumur - Sébastopol and Temple stations;
 on line 11, further east along the east–west axis of Rue Réaumur, between Rambuteau and République.

History
It opened on 19 October 1904 as part of the first section of Line 3 opened between Père Lachaise and Villiers. The Line 11 platforms opened as part of the original section of the line from Châtelet to Porte des Lilas on 28 April 1935.

It owes its name to its proximity to the Conservatoire national des arts et métiers, within which is housed the Musée des Arts et Métiers and is served by the station. The establishment was founded on a proposal by Father Henri Grégoire to the National Convention in 1794 and installed in the buildings of the former Royal Priory Saint-Martin-des-Champs.

The corridors as well as the platforms of the two lines were modernised after 1988, with those of line 3 being applied the decorative Ouï-dire style, in this case green in colour, while on line 11, to mark the bicentenary of the Conservatoire National des Arts et Métiers in October 1994, the platforms was redesigned by Belgian comics artist François Schuiten in a steampunk style reminiscent of the science fiction works of Jules Verne.

In 2018, 4,235,686 travellers entered this station which placed it at 119th position of metro stations for its usage.

As part of the RATP's Un métro + beau program on the one hand and the extension of line 11 to Rosny-Bois-Perrier on the other, the corridors of the station are undergoing renovations from 12 September 2019 to 3 December 2020 to test the coating materials of future stations.

Passenger services

Access
The station has five entrances all made up of fixed staircases, the first four being adorned with a Dervaux candelabrum:
 entrance 1 - Rue Conté, rue de Turbigo - odd numbered side leading to the right of 57, rue de Turbigo;
 entrance 2 - Rue Réaumur, rue de Turbigo - even numbers side located opposite 42, rue Réaumur;
 entrance 3 - Rue de Turbigo, rue Beaubourg located at the right of 107, rue de Turbigo and 48, rue Réaumur;
 entrance 4 - Rue Réaumur leading to 31, Rue de Turbigo and 51, Rue Réaumur;
 entrance 5 - Rue des Vertus, only allowing exit from the platforms of line 11, located at the right of 22 Rue Réaumur.

Station layout

Platforms
The platforms of the two lines, seventy-five meters long, are of standard configuration. Two in number per stopping point, they are separated by the metro tracks located in the centre and the vault is elliptical.

The station on line 3 is set up in a curve and its decoration is in the Ouï-dire style in a green colour. The lighting frames, of the same shade, are supported by curved supports in the shape of a scythe. The direct lighting is white while the indirect lighting, projected on the vault, is multi-coloured. The white ceramic tiles are flat and cover the walls, the vault (diagonally, a peculiarity that the stopping point only shares with Nation on line 1), the tunnel exit and the outlets of the corridors. The advertising frames are green and cylindrical, and the name of the station is written in capital letters on enamelled plates. The platforms are equipped with Motte style seats and green sit-stand benches.

The station on line 11 has been completely covered since October 1994 with copper plates riveted to each other, and not the usual earthenware tiles. This dressing was put in place during the bicentennial ceremonies of the Conservatoire National des Arts et Métiers. It is the work of Benoît Peeters, French screenwriter, and François Schuiten, Belgian designer, authors of the series Les Cités obscures. The traveller is plunged inside a vast machine, a sort of underground Nautilus evoking the atmosphere of Twenty Thousand Leagues Under the Sea, in steampunk style. On the station's ceiling, a series of large cogs evokes the Musée des Arts et Métiers. Copper, the only material used, evokes the technical and industrial world. On the platforms, a series of portholes open onto small scenographies, centred on the museum's collections. You observe a armillary sphere, the Telstar satellite, or even a water wheel. All the station's furniture suits the decoration style and constitutes a unique case on the network. Name plates, wooden seats, waste bins, flat tunnel exits, alarm post banners and the lighting are brown in the Ouï-dire style. However, the latter do not have multi-coloured lighting and the light is diffused in a semi-subdued way on the track side. The platforms are devoid of advertisements.

Bus connections
The station is served by lines 20, 38, 47 and 75 of the RATP Bus Network and, at night, by lines N12 and N23 of the Noctilien network.

Nearby
 Conservatoire national des arts et métiers
 Musée des arts et métiers

Gallery

References

Roland, Gérard (2003). Stations de métro. D’Abbesses à Wagram. Éditions Bonneton.

External links
  Station information and photographs at the Musée des Artes et Métiers website

Paris Métro stations in the 3rd arrondissement of Paris
Railway stations in France opened in 1904
Articles containing video clips